Barre or Barré is both a surname and a given name. Notable people with the name include:

Surname 
 Abdulrahman Jama Barre, former Foreign Minister of Somalia
 Alexandra Barré (born 1958), Hungarian-born Canadian sprint kayaker 
 Antoine Lefèbvre de La Barre (1622–1688), Governor of New France
 Denis Barré (born 1948), Canadian sprint canoer
 François-Jean de la Barre (1745–1766), French nobleman
 Hamza Abdi Barre (born 1972), prime minister of Somali
 Isaac Barré (1726–1802), Irish soldier and politician
 Jacques-Jean Barre (1793–1855), French engraver (also often styled "Jean-Jacques Barre")
 Jean Alexandre Barré (1880–1967), French neurologist
 Jean-Auguste Barre (1811–1896), French sculptor and medalist
 Jean-Benoît-Vincent Barré (1732–1824), French architect
 Martin Barre (born 1946), guitarist of rock band Jethro Tull
 Michel de la Barre (c. 1670–1745), French composer and flutist
 Mohammed Sulaymon Barre (born 1964), Ex-Guantánamo detainee
 Mylanie Barré (born 1979), Canadian sprint kayaker
 Pierre-Yves Barré (1749–1832), French vaudevillist and songwriter
 Raoul Barré (1874–1932), Canadian/American artist
 Raymond Barre (1924–2007), French politician and economist
 Richard Barre (c. 1130–c. 1202) Archdeacon of Ely and author
 Siad Barre (1919–1995), former President of Somalia
 W. J. Barre (1830–1867), Irish architect
 Weston La Barre (1911–1996), American anthropologist
 William de la Barre (1849–1936), Austrian engineer and salesman
 VC Barre (born 2003), Swedish rapper

Given name 
 Barre Phillips (born 1934), jazz and free improvisation bassist
 Barré Lyndon (1896–1972), British playwright and screenwriter